Gjerstad Station is a railway station located in the village of Gjerstad in the municipality of Gjerstad in Agder county, Norway.  The station sits along the Sørlandsbanen railway line and it is served by express trains to Kristiansand and Oslo.  The small station has a waiting room, parking for up to 25 cars, and bus and taxi connections to the surrounding area.

History
The station was opened in 1935 when the Sørlandet Line was extended from Neslandsvatn Station to Arendal Station.

References

Railway stations on the Sørlandet Line
Railway stations in Agder
Railway stations opened in 1935
1935 establishments in Norway
Gjerstad